Dave Mason (born November 2, 1949) is a former defensive back in the National Football League.

Biography
Mason was born David Clayton Mason on November 2, 1949, in Menominee, Michigan.

Career
Mason was drafted in the tenth round of the 1973 NFL Draft by the Minnesota Vikings and played that season with the New England Patriots. The following season, he played with the Green Bay Packers.

He played at the collegiate level at the University of Nebraska-Lincoln.

See also
List of New England Patriots players
List of Green Bay Packers players

References

1949 births
Living people
People from Menominee, Michigan
New England Patriots players
Green Bay Packers players
American football defensive backs
Nebraska Cornhuskers football players
Players of American football from Michigan